Michael Joseph Kiernan (born 17 January 1961) is a former  international rugby union player.

He had 43 caps for Ireland, from 1982 to 1991, scoring 6 tries, 40 conversions, 62 penalties and 6 drop goals, in an aggregate of 308 points. He was called for the 1987 Rugby World Cup, playing in three games and scoring 1 try, 7 conversions, 5 penalties and 1 drop goal, in an aggregate of 37 points.

In 1983 he toured New Zealand with the British and Irish Lions and at the time played club rugby for Dolphin RFC. His uncle, Tom Kiernan, was also an Irish and rugby union international and Lions player, as was his maternal uncle Mick Lane.

References

External links

Irish rugby union players
Ireland international rugby union players
British & Irish Lions rugby union players from Ireland
Dolphin RFC players
Lansdowne Football Club players
1961 births
Living people
People educated at Presentation Brothers College, Cork
Rugby union players from County Cork
Munster Rugby players
Rugby union centres